Kirkby Wharfe is a village  south of Tadcaster, in North Yorkshire, England. The village is in the civil parish of Kirkby Wharfe with North Milford and within Selby District Council.

The area around Kirkby Wharfe was settled in Roman times, with a permanent settlement being started in the 8th century. The village is recorded in the Domesday Book as being Chirchebi (church village), and both the village and Grimston Park came under the influence of the Baron of Pontefract at the time of Domesday.

Buses operate school services from the village into nearby Tadcaster, but the nearest public bus service runs from Ulleskelf with 5 buses a day between Tadcaster and Pontefract.

The area north east of the village is a designated SSSI. First notified in 1984, the SSSI details that the floodplain of the River Wharfe is an important site for marshland and the associated plants that grow on marshland around Dorts Dike (a tributary of the Wharfe that enters the river at Ulleskelf).

The church, much of which was built in the 14th century, serves as the parish church for the Ecclesiastical Parish of Kirkby Wharfe and Ulleskelfe[sic]. St Saviours at Ulleskelf village is a Chapel of Ease.

West of the village is Grimston Park Estate and was the former seat of Lord Londesborough. The estate buildings have been converted into luxury accommodation.

References

External links

Villages in North Yorkshire
Selby District